Lakhipur (IPA: ˈlækɪˌpʊə), is a town and a Municipal Board in Cachar district in the Indian state of Assam.

Etymology
The name Lakhipur is said to be very ancient. Two schools of opinion on the origin of its name exist. According to one school of opinion, the name relates to Lakshmi, the Hindu Goddess of wealth. Another school of opinion says that the place was named after notable Dimasa Kachari King Laxminarayan who ruled this part of the country in ancient times.

Geography
It has an average elevation of 22 metres (72 feet).

Demographics
 India census, Lakhipur had a population of 9,708. Male population 4,976 and female population is 4,732. Lakhipur has an average literacy rate of 60%, higher than the national average of 59.5%: male literacy is 67%, and female literacy is 52%. In Lakhipur, 16% of the population is under 6 years of age.

Climate
Climate of Lakhipur is significant for excessive humidity and being shut in by ranges of hills on North, East and South, heat during summer becomes unbearable. During rainy season, the air is surcharged with moisture and rainfall is extremely heavy. The winter is not so cold as that of Brahmaputra valley. The rainy season starts from May and continues up to October.

Lakhipur Municipal Board 
Lakhipur Town Committee was constituted in 1960 with 4 wards. These wards were revised to 10 wards in 1994 and further upgraded to 12 wards in 1999. The urban local body was given the status of Municipal Board vide Government of Assam notification number UDD(M)250/79/342 dated 21 July 2007.  After a gap of 13 years, Lakhipur Town Committee got a new chairman as the last election in Lakhipur was held in 1996.

Lakhipur Sub-Division 
Lakhipur Sub-Division was created in the year 1992 vide Govt. Notification No. GAG(B). 26/91/36 DTD. 23.03.1992 COMPRISING 212 Nos. of Revenue Villages. The Sub-Division has four Development Blocks and also four ICDS Projects, one Circle Office, two Police Stations and two Police Out Posts.

The Lakhipur Civil Sub-Diovision is bounded by in the East Manipur State, West – Silchar Sadar Sub-Division, North – Dima Hasao Autonomous District Border and South – Sonai Circle.  The total population of the Sub-Division is estimated at 2,52,642 (approx). The Sub-Division has been maintaining a unique unity in diversity although it has a population belonging to different caste, language, religion and cultural.

Names of Head of Offices under Lakhipur Sub-Division with Locations.

Office of the Sub-Divisional Police Officer, Lakhipur.
Office of the Circle Officer, Lakhipur.
Office of the Block Development Officer, Lakhipur (Fulertal).
Office of the Block Development Officer, Rajabazar.
Office of the Block Development Officer, Banskandi.
Office of the Block Development Officer, Binnakandi.
Office of the Child Development Project Officer, Lakhipur (Fulertal).
Office of the Child Development Project Officer, Rajabazar.
Office of the Child Development Project Officer, Banskandi.
Office of the Child Development Project Officer, Binnakandi.
Office of the Block Elementary Education Officer, Lakhipur (Pailapool).
Office of the Block Elementary Education Officer, Rajabazar.
Office of the Sub-Registrar (Registration), Lakhipur.
Office of the Sub-Divisional Agricultural Officer, Lakhipur.
Office of the Sub-Divisional Fishery Development Officer, Lakhipur.
Officer of the Inspector, Labour, Lakhipur.
Office of the Inspector, Handloom & Textiles, Lakhipur.
Office of the Officer-In-Charge, Lakhipur Police Station.
Office of the Officer-In-Charge, Jirighat Police Station.
Office of the In-Charge, Banskandi Investigation Centre, Banskandi.
Office of the In-Charge, Joypur Police Out Post, Joypur.
Office of the Sub-Divisional Information & Public Relations Officer, Lakhipur.
Office of the Range Forest Officer, Jirighat Range, Lakhipur.
Office of the Asstt. Executive Engineer, PHE, Lakhipur.
Office of the Asstt. Executive Engineer, ASEB, Lakhipur.
Office of the Sub-Divisional Welfare officer, Lakhipur (Chiripool).
Office of the Deputy Superintendent of Excise, Lakhipur.
Office of the Sub-Divisional Medical & Health Officer, Lakhipur.
Office of the Sub-Divisional Medical & Health Officer, Harinagar.
Office of the Manager, Sericulture Firm, Pailapool.
Office of the Manager, Govt. E.S.G. Harinagar, Cachar.
Office of the Asstt. Surgeon, Veterinary, Lokkhipur (Fulertal).
Office of the Asstt. Surgeon, Veterinary, Joypur.
Office of the Asstt. Surgeon, Veterinary, Banskandi.
Office of the In-Charge, Fire Service Station, Lakhipur.

REVENUE CIRCLE UNDER LAKHIPUR SUB-DIVISION.

There are two revenue Circle under Lakhipur Subdivision. They are--

Lakhipur Revenue Circle.
Sonai Revenue Circle (part).

DEVELOPMENT BLOCKS UNDER LAKHIPUR SUB-DIVISION.

Lakhipur Development Block, (Fulertal).
Rajabazar Development Block, Joypur Rajabazar.
Banskandi Development Block, Banskandi.
Binnakandi Development Block, Binnakandi.

HOSPITALS

Lakhipur PHC, Lakhipur.
Singerband PHC, Singerband.
Jirighat N.P.H.C. Jirighat.
Diger Fulertal S.H.C., Hmarkhawlien (Hatukhal).
Banskandi N.P.H.C., Banskandi.
Harinagar PHC, Harinagar.
Joypur S.H.C., Joypur Rajabazar.

Veterinary

Block Veterinary Dispensary and A. I. Centre, Lakhipur, Fulertal.
Joypur Veterinary Dispensary and A. I. Centre, Joypur.
Harinagar Veterinary Dispensary and A. I. Centre, Harinagar.
Banskandi Veterinary Dispensary and A. I. Centre, Banskandi.

EDUCATION
Nos. of College(s) – 3
Nos. of Higher Secondary School(s) – 4
Nos. of M.E. School(s) – 42
Nos. of M.E. Madrassa(s) – 6
Nos. of M.V. School(s) – 5
Nos. of Primary School(s) – 335
Nos. of Senior Basic School(s) – Nil
Nos. of Junior Basic School(s) – 5

TELEPHONE EXCHANGE
Lakhipur.
Banskandi
Joypur
Pailapool.
Harinagar.
Singerband

P.W.D. Roads: -

Fulertal – Lakhipur – Sapormoina Road.
Pailapool- Kumacherra Road.
Joypur Sibasthan Road.
Banskandi-Sonai Road
Binnakandi-Singerband

Railway Network:

One railway (Meter Gauge) link starting from Silchar to Jiribam (Manipur) Via-Lakhipur Sub-Division.

TEA GARDENS
Lakhipur
Jirighat
Dewan
Labac
Dilkoosh
Barthal
Thailoo
Narainpur
Pallorbond
Baladhan
Binnakandi
Bhuban Valley

Politics 
Lakhipur is part of Silchar (Lok Sabha constituency).

Notable People 
 Kaushik Rai - MLA of Lakhipur 
 Rajdeep Goala - Former MLA of Lakhipur 
 Dinesh Prasad Goala - Former MLA of Lakhipur

See also 
 Lakhipur Vidhan Sabha

References 

Silchar
Cities and towns in Cachar district